Substance Abuse is a Los Angeles based hip-hop group consisting of the duo Subz (Justin Hollingsworth) and Eso Tre (John Heath).  The group dropped their debut single "What The F**K You Rhymin' For?" in 2000 on the now defunct Ground Control Records, which was followed by the single "Can't Call It"/"No Guarantees" featuring P.E.A.C.E. and Thes One on Weapon Shaped Records.   Their debut album, Overproof, was released in 2006, and features cameos from Kool Keith, MF Doom, Motion Man, Saafir, and Rasco.  The album received four stars in URB and Scratch Magazine.  The group  released their sophomore effort, Background Music, featuring Tash, MC Eiht, KRS-One, Sadat X, Percee P, Myka 9, and Max Julien in 2013.  In 2016, they released the follow up EP, "Background Music: The Redux."

Discography

Albums
Overproof (Threshold Recordings, 2006)
Background Music (Feed The Peeps, 2013)
Background Music: The Redux (Feed The Peeps, 2016)

EPs
Brand New Crime (Rocketship Records, 1998)

References

External links
Official website
urbansmarts Interview 
legacy magazine Interview
Platform8470.com Interview
This is 50 Interview

American hip hop groups